Anselm Berrigan (born 1972) is an American poet and teacher.

Life and work
Anselm Berrigan grew up in New York City, where he currently resides with his wife, poet Karen Weiser. From 2003 to 2007, he served as artistic director at the St. Mark's Poetry Project. He is the brother of poet and musician Edmund Berrigan, half-brother of Kate Berrigan and scientist David Berrigan, son of poets Alice Notley and the late Ted Berrigan, and stepson of the late English poet and prose writer Douglas Oliver. He has also lived in Buffalo, New York at the "Ranch" and was known lovingly as "Anton" in San Francisco, California. He is a co-chair of the writing program at the Bard College summer MFA program and an adjunct teacher at Brooklyn College.  He has also taught writing at Wesleyan University, Rutgers University, Pratt Institute and the Jack Kerouac School of Disembodied Poetics at Naropa.  His newest works are a book-length poem called Notes From Irrelevance (2011), Sure Shot (2013), and Loading (2013), which was done in collaboration with artist Jonathan Allen. Berrigan received a Foundation for Contemporary Arts Grants to Artists award (2017).

Bibliography
 They Beat Me Over the Head With a Sack, a chapbook published in 1998.
 Integrity & Dramatic Life.  , a full-length collection published by Edge Books in 1999.
 Zero Star Hotel, a full-length collection published by Edge Books in 2002.
 "Pictures for Private Devotion", a CD (reading poems/no music/ narrow house), released in 2003.
 Some Notes on My Programming, a full-length collection published in 2006.
 Have a Good One, a chapbook published in 2008.
 To Hell With Sleep, a perfect-bound chapbook published in 2009.
 Free Cell published by City Lights in 2009. .
 Notes From Irrelevance (Wave Books, 2011)
 Sure Shot by Overpass Books in 2013.
 LOADING with Jonathan E. Allen by Brooklyn Arts Press in 2013. .
 Primitive State published by Edge Books in 2015 (with a cover by painter Marley Freeman).
 Get the Money!: Collected Prose (1961-1983), a collection of prose published by City Lights Books. 09/13/2022. .

Notes

References

External links
 Anselm Berrigan's author page on Wave Books' official website
 "Notes From Irrelevance" page on Wave Books' official website
 Anselm Berrigan's PennSound page
 Interview with Anselm Berrigan in the Fayetteville Flyer
 Poetry Foundation's author page for Anselm Berrigan

1972 births
Living people
Wesleyan University faculty
Poets from Illinois
Chapbook writers
21st-century American poets
Brooklyn College faculty